Aonia is an unincorporated community in Wilkes County, in the U.S. state of Georgia.

History
A post office called Aonia was established in 1843, and remained in operation until 1918. Aonia was located inland away from railroad lines.

References

Unincorporated communities in Wilkes County, Georgia
Unincorporated communities in Georgia (U.S. state)